Largs railway station is located on the Outer Harbor line. Situated in the north-western Adelaide suburb of Largs Bay, it is 15.5 kilometres from Adelaide station.

History 
The Largs station was opened in 1907. A short line to Largs Jetty branched off just south of the station, but this closed in 1908. Originally, Largs station had a centre track in that space that was connected between both tracks and used as holding siding for trains, hence why the gap between the platforms is unusually wider than most stations.

In 2014, some minor works were undertaken on the station to provide help with patrons from a nearby retirement village on Jetty Road. This included two new ramps on the Jetty Road side of the station, and parts of the platform was raised for wheelchairs.

Services by platform

References

Rails Through Swamp and Sand – A History of the Port Adelaide Railway.  M. Thompson  pub. Port Dock Station Railway Museum (1988)  

Railway stations in Adelaide
Railway stations in Australia opened in 1907
Lefevre Peninsula